Karl Eichfeld served as the War Minister of the Baden revolutionary provisional government in 1849.

References

Year of birth missing
Year of death missing
Place of birth missing
Place of death missing
German politicians